In Nippon Professional Baseball, players born outside of Japan are often known as international players. This list includes all international players who are currently on NPB 70-man rosters and thus eligible to play  in Nippon Professional Baseball or either of the two "ni-gun" leagues, the Western League and the Eastern League. As both the Central League and Pacific League have a limit on foreign players on the 28-man first team (ichi-gun) rosters (maximum of four foreign players which must be a mix of pitchers and position players), there are currently just sixty-nine active players on NPB 70-man rosters. This list does include foreign-born players who qualify as Japanese through residency, such as Yaku Cho and Wladimir Balentien, but does not include Japanese-born players who are eligible for other national teams, such as Yuma Mune and Brandon Tysinger.

List is accurate as of March 1, 2023 (Registered for 2023 season):

References

Nippon Professional Baseball players
Nippon Professional Baseball